Jonathan Reid Cornelius (born June 2, 1970) is an American former professional baseball player and current bullpen coach for the Colorado Rockies of Major League Baseball (MLB). He played in MLB for all or parts of three seasons between 1995 and 2000 for the Montreal Expos, New York Mets, and Florida Marlins.

Career
Cornelius was born in Thomasville, Alabama to Ted, a school principal, and Ila Cornelius, a teacher's aide. His older brother, Pat, played college baseball at Auburn. He maintained a 97.6 grade average at Thomasville High School. He planned to play college baseball at Mississippi State but chose instead to begin a professional career after being taken in the eleventh round of the 1988 Major League Baseball draft by the Montreal Expos and receiving a signing bonus of $225,000. According to his father, it was the largest contract ever given to a high school draftee. He began his professional career with the Rockford Expos of the Midwest League.

Cornelius was the Marlins bullpen coach from 2010 to 2016. He was named the pitching coach for the Triple-A Gwinnett Braves prior to the 2017 season.

Cornelius was named as the pitching coach for the Jupiter Hammerheads of the Miami Marlins organization for the 2019 season.

Cornelius was named the bullpen coach for the Colorado Rockies on December 13, 2021.

References

External links

1970 births
Living people
American expatriate baseball players in Canada
Baseball coaches from Alabama
Baseball players from Alabama
Buffalo Bisons (minor league) players
Calgary Cannons players
Charlotte Knights players
Colorado Rockies (baseball) coaches
Florida Marlins players
Harrisburg Senators players
Major League Baseball bullpen coaches
Major League Baseball pitchers
Miami Marlins coaches
Minor league baseball coaches
Montreal Expos players
New York Mets players
Norfolk Tides players
Ottawa Lynx players
People from Thomasville, Alabama
Portland Sea Dogs players
Rockford Expos players
Tucson Sidewinders players
West Palm Beach Expos players